Heinz London (Bonn, Germany 7 November 1907 – 3 August 1970) was a German-British physicist. Together with his brother Fritz London he was a pioneer in the field of superconductivity.

Biography 
London was born in Bonn in a liberal Jewish-German family. His father, Franz London, was professor of mathematics at the University of Bonn and his mother, Luise Burger, was the daughter of a prosperous textile manufacturer. His father died of heart failure when Heinz was nine years old. The greatest influence on Heinz's childhood was his older brother Fritz. Throughout their lives the two brothers maintained a close relationship.

Heinz followed in his older brother's footsteps, studying physics, but became an experimental physicist instead and obtained his PhD under the famous superconductivity physicist Francis Simon.

This connection also gave Heinz the opportunity to leave Nazi Germany. Frederick Lindemann invited Francis Simon to join the Clarendon Laboratory at the University of Oxford in 1933 supported by money obtained from chemical company ICI. When Francis Simon did he brought Heinz London as his assistant as well as Nicholas Kurti.

While working in Oxford, Heinz shared a rented house with his brother Fritz and sister in-law Edith where together the brothers developed the London equations.

By 1936 the money that had funded the refugee scientists had dried up and Lindemann could not find funds to offer positions to them and many others. Heinz was in a junior position without any expectation of remaining at Oxford, and so took an appointment at the University of Bristol. Fritz held out for a position at Oxford which never came and later accepted an offer by the Henri Poincaré Institute in Paris, in September 1939 moved to the Duke University After the outbreak of World War II.

In 1940 Heinz was declared a civilian enemy alien and interned on the Isle of Man, but was then released to co-operate with the British nuclear program. In 1942 he obtained British citizenship.

Heinz was a lifelong heavy smoker and died from lung cancer in 1970. He was an atheist.

Education
London studied at multiple institutions as was customary at the time in Germany. He was at the University of Bonn in 1926/27. After that he interned for six months at a chemical plant for Heraeus in Hanau, Germany. In 1929 he spent a year of study at the Technical University Berlin-Charlottenburg (now the Technical University of Berlin) and then he was at the University of Munich until 1931. In late 1933, he obtained his PhD under the low temperature physicist Franz Simon at the University of Breslau, with a thesis "on the possibility of the occurrence of high frequency residual resistance in superconductors".

Career
London worked with his brother Fritz London on superconductivity, discovering the London equations when working at the University of Oxford, in the Clarendon Laboratory.

These equations gave a first explanation to the Meissner effect (and, so, to the properties of superconductors). He is known as well for being the inventor of the dilution refrigerator, a cryogenic device that uses liquid helium.

Honours and awards
London was elected a Fellow of the Royal Society in 1961, his nomination read

References 

1907 births
1970 deaths
Jewish emigrants from Nazi Germany to the United Kingdom
People interned in the Isle of Man during World War II
Fellows of the Royal Society
Academics of the University of Bristol